Carposina apousia is a moth in the Carposinidae family. It was described by Clarke in 1971. It is found on Rapa Island.

References

Natural History Museum Lepidoptera generic names catalog

Carposinidae
Moths described in 1971